Edward Phelips may refer to:

 Sir Edward Phelips (speaker) (c. 1555/60–1614), English lawyer and politician, Speaker of the English House of Common and subsequently Master of the Rolls
 Sir Edward Phelips Jr. (1638–1699), English landowner and politician who sat in the House of Commons at various times between 1661 and 1699
 Edward Phelips (Royalist) (1613–1680), English landowner and politician who sat in the House of Commons at various times between 1640 and 1679
 Edward Phelips (died 1797) (1725–1797), English country landowner and politician

See also 
 Edward Phillips (disambiguation)